Potassium perbromate is the chemical compound composed of the potassium ion and the perbromate ion, with the chemical formula KBrO4.

Preparation
Potassium perbromate can be prepared by reacting perbromic acid with potassium hydroxide:

References

Potassium compounds
 Perbromates